The 1986 Ohio State Buckeyes football team represented the Ohio State University in the  1986 NCAA Division I-A football season. The Buckeyes compiled a 10–3 record, including the 1987 Cotton Bowl Classic in Dallas, where they won 28–12 against the Texas A&M Aggies.

Schedule

Personnel

Depth chart

Game summaries

vs. Alabama

at Washington

Colorado

Utah

Illinois

at Indiana

at Purdue

Dave Brown's interception return set a Big Ten record for longest in a single game.

Minnesota

Iowa

Northwestern

Wisconsin

Michigan

Matt Frantz missed a 45-yard field goal that would have given Ohio State the lead with 1:01 remaining in the game. Chris Spielman had 29 tackles in defeat.

vs. Texas A&M (Cotton Bowl)

1987 NFL draftees

References

Ohio State
Ohio State Buckeyes football seasons
Big Ten Conference football champion seasons
Cotton Bowl Classic champion seasons
Ohio State Buckeyes football